Selim Gündüz (born 16 May 1994) is a German professional footballer who plays as a midfielder for Turkish club Ankara Keçiörengücü.

Career
On 31 August 2018, the last day of the 2018 summer transfer window, Gündüz joined 2. Bundesliga side Darmstadt 98 from league rivals VfL Bochum having agreed a season-long contract. His one-year contract was not extended after relegation in spring 2019.

Gündüz then received a contract valid until June 2020 at KFC Uerdingen 05. Until matchday 11, he was regularly utilised in midfield and on the right wing, but was then demoted to the bench until the end of the season. The club did not renew his expiring contract. For the following season, Gündüz remained in the 3. Liga and signed a one-year contract with Hallescher FC, which was then terminated in mid-March 2021 due to personal reasons.

On 22 December 2021, Gündüz joined Alemannia Aachen on a free transfer after nearly a month of training with the club.

Career statistics

References

External links
 
 

1994 births
Sportspeople from Siegen
Footballers from North Rhine-Westphalia
German people of Turkish descent
Living people
German footballers
Association football forwards
Association football midfielders
VfL Bochum players
VfL Bochum II players
SV Darmstadt 98 players
KFC Uerdingen 05 players
Hallescher FC players
Alemannia Aachen players
Ankara Keçiörengücü S.K. footballers
Regionalliga players
2. Bundesliga players
3. Liga players
German expatriate footballers
Expatriate footballers in Turkey
German expatriate sportspeople in Turkey